Hasham Balm (also Romanized as Ḩashām Balm, Ḩasham Balm, Hāshem Balm, Ḩasham Balam, and Ḩāshombalm; also known as Ashām Bolān and Asham Sullam) is a village in Ahmadi Rural District, Ahmadi District, Hajjiabad County, Hormozgan Province, Iran. At the 2006 census, its population was 440, in 103 families.

References 

Populated places in Hajjiabad County